Chah Sorkh (also Romanized as Chāh Sorkh) is a village in Sakhvid Rural District, Nir District, Taft County, Yazd Province, Iran. At the 2006 census, its population was 24, in 11 families.

References 

Populated places in Taft County